Geert Bekaert is a Belgian economist. He is a professor at Columbia Business School and the managing editor of the Journal of Banking and Finance.

Biography 
Bekaert received his B.A. from Ghent University and Ph.D. from Northwestern University under Robert J. Hodrick. He began his academic career at the Stanford Graduate School of Business before joining the faculty of Columbia Business School in 1999. He held the Leon G. Cooperman Professorship of Finance and Economics until 2019. Bekaert's research focused on international finance and foreign exchange market efficiency.

Bekaert is the co-recipient of a William Sharpe Award in 2012 from the Journal of Financial and Quantitative Analysis. He has been a research associate of the National Bureau of Economic Research since 1999.

References 

Living people
Columbia Business School faculty
Belgian economists
Ghent University alumni
Northwestern University alumni
Stanford University faculty
International finance economists
Year of birth missing (living people)